"Into the Sun'" is the first and final single for Tarja Turunen's first-ever live album Act I. It was released on July 13, 2012, only as a digital version. Later a studio version of the song was recorded and added to "Colours In The Dark" album as bonus track.

Track listing
 "Into the Sun" (Radio Edit) [Live] – 4:32

Music video
An official music video was released on July 27, 2012
The music video itself is a remixed live version from her live concert Act I: Live in Rosario.

References

External links

2012 singles
Tarja Turunen songs
Songs written by Anders Wollbeck
Songs written by Tarja Turunen
Songs written by Mattias Lindblom
2012 songs